Trippin' with the Kandasamys is a 2021 South African film directed by Jayan Moodley, written by Rory Booth and Jayan Moodley and starring Mariam Bassa, Maeshni Naicker and Jailoshini Naidoo. It's the third installment in the series, following Keeping Up with the Kandasamys and Kandasamys: The Wedding.

Cast 
 Mariam Bassa	as Aaya Kandasamy	
 Maeshni Naicker as Shanti Naidoo
 Jailoshini Naidoo as Jennifer Kandasamy
 Koobeshan Naidoo as Elvis Kandasamy
 Yugan Naidoo as Preggie Naidoo
 Mishqah Parthiephal as Jodie Kandasamy Naidoo
 Madhushan Singh as Prishen Naidoo
 Uraysha Ramrachia as Baby Naidoo
 Rushil Juglall as Arsevan
 Tesarnia Oree as Poobasha

Release
The film was released internationally on 4 June 2021 by Netflix.

Reception
Trippin with the Kandasamys was released to positive reviews from critics, with Mariam Bassa's and Jailoshini Naidoo's performances receiving praise. The New York Post film review website Decider stated that "the jokes are fun, especially the ones delivered by Bassa", and praised the performances of Jailoshini Naidoo and Maeshni Naicker as "winning and funny in their roles at the helm of the film". Hollywood Insider praised the film's cinematography and the chemistry of the lead cast, but felt the film dragged in some moments. News24 rated the film 3 out of 5 stars and praised the "incredible comedic duo" of Naidoo and Naicker and Bass's "gambling grandmother's unexpected wit and wisdom".

References

External links
 
 

2021 films
English-language Netflix original films
South African Indian films
English-language South African films
2020s English-language films